Pushtulim is a rural locality (a selo) and the administrative center of Pushtulimsky Selsoviet, Yeltsovsky District, Altai Krai, Russia. The population was 705 as of 2013. There are 14 streets.

Geography 
Pushtulim is located 16 km southeast of Yeltsovka (the district's administrative centre) by road. Kaltyk is the nearest rural locality.

References 

Rural localities in Yeltsovsky District